Trine Schøning Torp (born 18 February 1970 in Glostrup) is a Danish politician, who is a member of the Folketing for the Socialist People's Party. She was elected into parliament at the 2015 Danish general election.

Political career
Torp was a member of the municipal council of Halsnæs Municipality from 2009 to 2015. She was first elected into parliament at the 2015 election, where she received 2,494 votes. She was reelected in 2019 with 4,307 votes.

References

External links 
 Biography on the website of the Danish Parliament (Folketinget)

1970 births
Living people
People from Glostrup Municipality
Socialist People's Party (Denmark) politicians
Danish municipal councillors
21st-century Danish women politicians
Women members of the Folketing
Members of the Folketing 2015–2019
Members of the Folketing 2019–2022
20th-century Danish women